The Shropshire Football Association is the governing body of football in the county of Shropshire, England.

Cup competitions it organises include the Shropshire Senior Cup, the Challenge Cup and the Junior Challenge Cup.

See also
Football in Shropshire
Mercian Regional Football League
Shropshire County Premier Football League

References

External links

County football associations
Football in Shropshire